The  2001 Albuquerque mayoral election was held on October 2, 2001 to elect the Mayor of Albuquerque.

Former Mayor Martin Chavez did not run for re-election in 1997, and instead was the Democratic nominee for Governor of New Mexico. He lost to Gary Johnson, and announced his plans to run against incumbent mayor Jim Baca in 2001. Former District Attorney and District Court judge Bob Schwartz lost the election to Chavez by a mere 2,783 votes. Chavez received 30,384 votes (37.9%) to Schwartz's 27,601 (34.4%), Mike McEntee's 11,176 (13.9%), and Baca's 10,998 (13.7%).

Candidates
Jim Baca, incumbent mayor (Democratic)
Martin Chavez, former mayor (Democratic)
Mike McEntee, FAA employee  (Republican)
Bob Schwartz, attorney (Republican)

References 

Mayoral elections in Albuquerque, New Mexico
Albuquerque
October 2001 events in the United States